Antônio Luiz dos Santos (born July 16, 1914, date of death unknown) was an Olympic breaststroke swimmer from Brazil, who participated at one Summer Olympics for his native country. At the 1936 Summer Olympics in Berlin, he swam the 200-metre breaststroke, not reaching the finals.

References

1914 births
Year of death missing
Swimmers at the 1936 Summer Olympics
Olympic swimmers of Brazil
Place of birth missing
Brazilian male breaststroke swimmers